Erkki Koutonen (March 25, 1926 – December 15, 1986) was an American athlete. He competed in the men's triple jump at the 1948 Summer Olympics.

References

1926 births
1986 deaths
Athletes (track and field) at the 1948 Summer Olympics
American male triple jumpers
Olympic track and field athletes of the United States
Place of birth missing